is an English contract law case, concerning the doctrine of consideration, and part payments of debt.

Facts
Selectmove Ltd owed the Inland Revenue substantial sums in outstanding tax and national insurance. The managing director, Mr ffooks, met with Mr Polland, from the Inland Revenue and said he would pay future tax as it fell due and the arrears at £1,000 a month. Mr Polland said he would have to check and would contact the managing director if it was unacceptable. Selectmove Ltd heard nothing until a £25,650 notice came in and a threat of a wind-up petition. Mr ffooks subsequently claimed that the Revenue had said he could repay less. The High Court held that even if that were found to be true, Mr Polland had not bound the Revenue, and there was no consideration for the varied agreement anyway.

Judgment
Peter Gibson LJ (Stuart-Smith and Balcombe LJJ concurring) observed that Foakes v Beer precluded any variation of the agreement to repay the debt without good consideration, despite the recent decision in Williams v Roffey Bros Ltd. Peter Gibson LJ stated that ‘it is clear… that a practical benefit of that nature is not good consideration in law’. As his Lordship put it, in forceful language,

Notes

References
E Peel, ‘Part Payment of a Debt is No Consideration’ (1994) 100 LQR 353

English contract case law
Court of Appeal (England and Wales) cases
1993 in case law
1993 in British law